2017–18 NCAA Division I women's ice hockey rankings 

Two polls make up the 2017–18 NCAA Division I women's ice hockey rankings, the USCHO.com poll and the USA Today/USA Hockey Magazine poll. As the 2017–18 season progresses, rankings are updated weekly.

USCHO

USA Today

References 

2017–18 NCAA Division I women's hockey season
College women's ice hockey rankings in the United States